The Order of Bards, Ovates & Druids or OBOD is a Neo-Druidic organisation based in England, but based in part on the Welsh Gorsedd of Bards. It has grown to become a dynamic druid organisation, with members in all parts of the world.

The concept of the three roles of bards, ovates and druids originates from the writings of the ancient Greek historian and geographer Strabo, who in his Geographica, written in the 20s CE, stated that amongst the Gauls, there were three types of honoured figures: the poets and singers known as bardoi, the diviners and specialists in the natural world known as o'vateis, and those who studied "moral philosophy", the druidai. Nonetheless, Strabo's accuracy has been called into question, as he was not actually well acquainted with Gaul and was likely relying on earlier sources whose accuracy is also disputed.

Leadership
OBOD was founded in 1964 as a split from the Ancient Druid Order with Ross Nichols as its leader.

In 1988, more than a decade after Nichols' passing, and after study in the Order and helping to further its reaches, Philip Carr-Gomm was asked to lead the Order. Other notable members also hold somewhat senior positions in the order, often with the title of "Honorary Bard". A good example of this is Damh the Bard,   who is involved in the UK groves and running the podcast. Damh runs his own website where he has just completed work on a bardic version of Branch Three of the Mabinogion, makes regular house concerts on YouTube,  and contributes regularly to another podcast, The Celtic Myth Podshow,  which has also dramatised the Mabinogion tales.

Eimear Burke was installed as the new Chief of the Order in June 2020.  Burke, who had served as leader of the Kilkenny Druid Grove, was named to the position two years prior. Due to the social lockdown caused by the coronavirus, her installation proceeded without the special gathering of OBOD members that had originally been planned. The induction ceremony was broadcast on the Order's YouTube channel, with select leaders present, including the Scribe, Stephanie Carr-Gomm, and the Pendragon, Dave Smith. Burke has been a frequent contributor to OBOD's Tea With A Druid series as well as running a YouTube channel for the Kilkenny Grove. Immediately prior to Burke's installation, Philip Carr-Gomm gave a short farewell speech featuring a musical contribution in the form of bagpipe playing from his friend and trusted Order member, Chris Park.

Dissemination
The OBOD teachings are available principally in the form of a distance-learning course available online or by mail. There is a network of mentors, many using email, to support the students’ progress through the grades of Bard, Ovate and Druid. Members meet at camps, at workshops and assemblies in various parts of the world, and a network of groves and seedgroups also exists. There are a number of internet forums, a private members’ website in addition to OBOD's public-access site, and a monthly journal Touchstone. Quarterly journals are also published by members in various parts of the world: Dryade for Dutch-speaking members, Menhir in French, Druidenstein in German, Il Calderone in Italian, Ophiusa in Portuguese and two regional English-language magazines—SerpentStar in Australasia and Druid in North America.

Teachings

The teachings of the Order could be seen as typical of Neo-druidism  today, in that it teaches its followers the belief of the sanctity of nature and a belief in the Otherworld. Although its teaching draws upon Celtic sources, it also incorporates ideas from modern psychology and the Human Potential movement, and membership is open to followers of any religion.

Many members of the Order prefer to learn at home, solitary, as opposed to recorded Druids of early pre-Christian Britain that would have congregated to share wisdom or meet for occasion. Members are sent course information and materials, and may be assigned a tutor if they wish to have someone to communicate with.

Individual Druids and the groups that they practice with are allowed to decide their own pantheons. Many members follow Celtic pantheons, usually relating to the four pre-Christian Celtic nations of England, Scotland, Wales and Ireland, as well as related beliefs and practices, such as ancestral worship, naturism, polytheism and Spiritualism. The Order's official teachings, however, are presented ecumenically as a spiritual philosophy compatible with many religious beliefs, and other members hold monotheistic, pantheistic, atheistic, and other views. Many OBOD Druids identify as Pagan, but others identify as Christian, Jewish, Buddhist, Hindu, or many other religions, while some follow Druidry as their primary or only spiritual path.

The Order possesses an online presence regarding Druidic teachings. OBOD has an online library which carries articles on different aspects of Druidry and topics which would be of interest to Druids, including serious scholarly work such as The Mount Haemus Lectures. There is a regular podcast which is advertised through the Order's Facebook page called Druidcast which features music, lectures and an introduction by musician Dave Smith aka. Damh the Bard, this has now reached episode 158 after many years of broadcasting. Subjects cover not just Druidry but a wide spectrum of paganism as well as bardic performances. The Order also broadcasts a weekly podcast, Tea With A Druid, which has currently reached 126 episodes. Each episode consists of a story followed by a brief meditation, led by a different member of OBOD each week.

References

External links
 The Order of Bards, Ovates and Druids
 Druidcast - A Druid podcast by the Order of Bards Ovates and Druids

Neo-druidism in Britain
Religious organizations established in 1964
Modern pagan organisations based in the United Kingdom
Neo-druid orders
Modern pagan organizations established in the 1960s